KFSK is a non-commercial, Community Radio Station radio station in Petersburg, Alaska, broadcasting on 100.9 FM, and rebroadcasting over 4 translators. The station Produces local news and broadcasts local content from Borough Assembly Meetings, School Board Meetings to High School Basketball Games and Community Cultural Events.  KFSK provides programming from National Public Radio, The Alaska Public Radio Network, BBC World Service, and the Public Radio Exchange. KFSK hosts locally produced volunteer-hosted music programs and local call-in programs on issues of interest to the community. KFSK is supported by local businesses, organizations and local membership support.

Low power translator stations

External links
KFSK's website

FSK
NPR member stations
FSK
Radio stations established in 1986
1986 establishments in Alaska